Bickley railway station is on the Chatham Main Line in England, serving the town of Bickley in the London Borough of Bromley, south-east London. Southeastern trains branch from the main line south of Bickley and run to  via . Thameslink services run either via Petts Wood or St Mary Cray on the main line.

Bickley is in Travelcard Zone 5.

History

In 1860 the station was renamed Bickley.

To the east of the station are what are known as the Bickley Loops which connect the Chatham Main Line with the South Eastern Main Line (formerly of the South Eastern Railway, constructed in 1902 by the newly unified South Eastern and Chatham Railway.

Layout
The station lies on the four-track main line, fast and slow lines paired; crossovers allow trains to use the Bickley Loops. There are two island platforms, with stairs leading up to the station buildings at the country end of the station, located on Southborough Road.

Services
Services at Bickley are operated by Southeastern and Thameslink using ,  and  EMUs.

The typical off-peak service in trains per hour is:
 2 tph to  via 
 2 tph to London Blackfriars via 
 2 tph to 
 2 tph to  via 

In addition, the service to London Blackfriars is extended to and from  via .

Connections
London Buses routes 162, 269, 336 and R7 serve the station.

References

External links 

Railway stations in the London Borough of Bromley
Former London, Chatham and Dover Railway stations
Railway stations in Great Britain opened in 1858
Railway stations served by Southeastern
Railway stations served by Govia Thameslink Railway